Pärnu JK Tervis is an Estonian football team from Pärnu. Founded in 1921 as Spordiselts Pärnu "Tervis", it is the oldest sports club of Pärnu. The club colors are white, black, and blue.

History 
Spordiselts Pärnu "Tervis" was founded on 11 April 1921 and became the first sports club in Pärnu. The early years saw weightlifting become the most popular and successful sport section in the club, with heavyweight weightlifter Arnold Luhaäär notably winning a silver medal in the 1928 Amsterdam Summer Olympics. In 1925, Tervis' football team gained promotion to the top division of Estonian football and competed in the championship until the 1928 season. Pärnu Tervis returned to top-flight football in 1935 and finished 4th in the following season, with Richard Kuremaa scoring 16 goals for the club. The club was disbanded in 1940, after the Soviet occupation of Estonia.

Pärnu Tervis was re-established in 1991, after Estonia had regained its independence. The club took part in the 1995−96 Intertoto Cup, where they notably faced Bayer 04 Leverkusen. From 1996 to 1999, the club was known as Lelle SK and played its home games in Lelle, a small borough in Kehtna Parish. After the resignation of the club's president Urmas Hanson, Pärnu Tervis was acquired by FC Flora to act as a reserve team for them. Tervis was dissolved in 2005 so that Pärnu would be represented by only local teams in the future.

In 2022, Pärnu JK Tervis was brought back to existence by former professional footballers, whom many had played for Pärnu Vaprus the previous season. The club entered the fifth tier of Estonian football.

Pärnu Tervis in Estonian Football

Pärnu Tervis in Europe
 1R – 1st Round

References

Tervis Parnu
Tervis Parnu
 
Sport in Pärnu
1922 establishments in Estonia
Association football clubs established in 1922